Robert Sullivan (born 1967) is a Māori poet, academic and editor. His published poetry collections include Jazz Waiata (1990), Star Waka (1999) and Shout Ha! to the Sky (2010). His books are postmodern, explore social and racial issues, and explore aspects of Māori culture and history.

Biography and writing
Sullivan is of Māori and Irish descent. His grandfather was an immigrant to New Zealand from Galway. He identifies with the Ngā Puhi (Ngāti Manu/Ngāti Hau) and Kāi Tahu iwi, and describes himself as multicultural.

He graduated from the University of Auckland with a PhD and worked as Associate Professor of English and Director of the Creative Writing Programme at the University of Hawai'i. Sullivan led until recently the creative writing programme at the Manukau Institute of Technology before becoming the Deputy Chief Executive Māori there from 2018 to 2020. He is an editor of online literary journal trout.

Sullivan's nine books include the bestselling Star Waka (1999), reprinted five times and shortlisted in 2000 for the Montana New Zealand Book Awards. Maui: Legends of the Outcast (1997), illustrated by Chris Slane, the first New Zealand graphic novel, was shortlisted for the LIANZA Russell Clark Medal. His book-length poem Captain Cook in the Underworld was long-listed for the Montana New Zealand Book Awards in the Poetry Category. It was originally commissioned as the libretto for an oratorio by noted composer John Psathas which has been performed at the Wellington and Auckland Town Halls by the New Zealand Symphony Orchestra and the Orpheus Choir of Wellington.  His first collection, Jazz Waiata, won the PEN (NZ) Best First Book Award, and his children's retelling of Māori myths and legends, Weaving Earth and Sky, illustrated by Gavin Bishop, won the non-fiction category and was Children's Book of the Year in the 2003 New Zealand Post Children's Book Awards. With Albert Wendt and Reina Whaitiri, he has co-edited several anthologies of poetry. Their Polynesian poetry anthology, Whetu Moana, won the Reference and Anthology category in the 2004 Montana New Zealand Book Awards, and their Māori poetry anthology, Puna Wai Kōrero, won the 2015 Creative Writing category in the Ngā Kupu Ora Māori Book Awards.

His wide-ranging work explores dimensions of Māori tradition as well as "contemporary urban experiences, including local racial and social concerns." His writing has a post modern feel and shows acute awareness of important Aotearoa/New Zealand issues while linking them in a complex way back to the cultural past. In the poetic narrative Star Waka (1999), for example, Sullivan employs traditional Māori story-telling techniques (oral tradition) in order to link contemporary and traditional topics from Aotearoa/New Zealand with concepts and ideas from a European background. This approach allows him to study the identity relation between Māori and Pākehā within transcultural themes of voyaging, personal and national, of the poet and of Māori. In a sense, the poems in Star Waka "themselves function like a waka." Star Waka was "lauded for its poetic flair".

He is "widely seen as one of the most important contemporary Māori poets".

Critical reception
Sullivan's Shout Ha! to the Sky (2010) was described by Paula Green in the New Zealand Herald as "a stunning symphony of love, politics, tenderness, confession, sharpness and insight", which "should be in every school library and accompany the journey of any reader drawn to the history and politics of where we come from and who we are". She described his collection Cassino (2010), which paid tribute to those who died and fought at the Battle of Monte Cassino during World War II, as again highlighting his "wide-ranging voice" and being "sumptuous in content yet simple in execution".

Works
 Jazz Waiata (1990)
 Piki Ake!: Poems 1990–92 (1993)
 Maui – Legends of the Outcast (1996)
 Star Waka (1999; German translation: Sternen-Waka, 2012)
 Weaving Earth and Sky : Myths & Legends of Aotearoa (2002)
 Captain Cook in the Underworld (2002)
 Voice Carried My Family (2005)
 Shout Ha! to the Sky (2010) 
 Cassino: City of Martyrs (2010)

 
 
 Puna Wai Kōrero: An Anthology of Māori Poetry in English (2014) coedited with Reina Whaitiri

References

External links
 Academy of New Zealand Literature author page
 New Zealand Literature File: Robert Sullivan
 New Zealand Electronic Poetry Centre: Robert Sullivan
 Pasifika Poetry: Video-Interview with Robert Sullivan, conducted by Selina Tusitala Marsh
 WaterBridge Review (January 2005): Conversation with Robert Sullivan

New Zealand poets
New Zealand male poets
New Zealand Māori writers
Living people
Ngāpuhi people
Ngāi Tahu people
1967 births
Academic staff of Manukau Institute of Technology
20th-century New Zealand poets
21st-century New Zealand poets